The 2019–20 season is the 62nd season in the club history of the handball branch of Zamalek, the season began with African Handball Super Cup on the 4th of April 2019, as Zamalek competes for the Egyptian Handball League, Egypt Handball Cup and IHF Super Globe, African Handball Champions League.

Competitions

Overview

2019 African Super Cup 

The season began with the African Handball Super Cup on the 4th of April 2019, and ended with Zamalek achieving the African title for the 6th times in the Club History.

2019 IHF Super Globe 
''This competition was held in a knock-out format starting from the quarterfinals qualification, and 10 teams participated in this competition, Zamalek began directly from the quarterfinals.

Quarter-finals

Placement round 5–10

Group B

Egyptian League

First Stage

Matches 
(Round 1)

(Round 2)

(Round 3)

(Round 4)

(Round 5)

(Round 6)

(Round 7)

(Round 8)

(Round 9)

(Round 10)

(Round 11)

(Round 12)

(Round 13)

(Round 14)

(Round 15)

(Round 16)

(Round 17)

Second stage

Matches 
(Round 1)

(Round 2)

(Round 3)

(Round 4)

(Round 5)

Final Decision 

The league was suspended on March 6, 2019, due to the outbreak of the new Corona virus, and then it was announced on May 22 that the season had been canceled with the clubs’ approval.

The Board of Directors of the Egyptian Handball Federation Egyptian Handball Federation announced giving Zamalek the title , due to its position on the league table, in addition to being the champion of the previous version, on May 22, 2021.

Egyptian Cup 

Canceled due to COVID-19 pandemic

African Champions League

Matches 
(Round 1)

(Round 2)

(Round 3)

(Round 4)

(Quarter-Finals)

(Semi-Finals)

(Finals)

References

Zamalek SC
Handball in Egypt
Zamalek SC seasons